John Henry Lace  (1857–1918) was a British botanist.

Biography
From 1881 he worked extensively in the Forest Service of India and became its inspector-general of forests. From 1908 to 1913 he served as chief forest conservator in Burma. He made botanical collections in Afghanistan, Baluchistan, India and Burma.

He married Minnie Richbell. They had three daughters, Violet Sylvia (b. 1894 in E. India), Ethel Douglas (b. 1896 in Bengal), and Dorothy Mabel (b. 1899 in Bengal). In 1920 Ethel Douglas Lace married a grandson of General Sir John Watson.

Selected publications
 with W. B. Hemsley:

Eponyms

 (Acanthaceae) Thunbergia lacei Gamble
 (Apocynaceae) Aganosma lacei Raizada
 (Arecaceae) Pinanga lacei A.J.Hend.
 (Asclepiadaceae) Bidaria lacei (Craib) M.A.Rahman & Wilcock
 (Asteraceae) Uechtritzia lacei (Watt) C.Jeffrey
 (Balsaminaceae) Impatiens lacei Hook.f.
 (Clusiaceae) Hypericum lacei N.Robson
 (Cyperaceae) Fimbristylis lacei Turrill
 (Dryopteridaceae) Tectaria lacei Holttum
 (Elaeocarpaceae) Elaeocarpus lacei Craib
 (Ericaceae) Agapetes lacei Craib
 (Euphorbiaceae) Acalypha lacei Hutch.
 (Fabaceae) Paraderris lacei (Dunn) Adema
 (Gentianaceae) Swertia lacei Craib
 (Gesneriaceae) Ornithoboea lacei Craib
 (Lamiaceae) Gomphostemma lacei Mukerjee
 (Magnoliaceae) Magnolia lacei (W.W.Sm.) Figlar
 (Orchidaceae) Platanthera lacei Rolfe ex Downie
 (Poaceae) Ischaemum lacei Stapf ex Bor
 (Polygalaceae) Polygala lacei Craib
 (Primulaceae) Dionysia lacei (Hemsl. & Watt) S.Clay
 (Ranunculaceae) Delphinium lacei Munz
 (Rosaceae) Cotoneaster lacei G.Klotz
 (Rubiaceae) Ixora lacei Bremek.
 (Scrophulariaceae) Wightia lacei Craib
 (Styracaceae) Parastyrax lacei W.W.Sm.
 (Tiliaceae) Grewia lacei J.R.Drumm. & Craib

References

External links
 

1857 births
1918 deaths
19th-century British botanists
20th-century British botanists
Fellows of the Linnean Society of London
Fellows of the Royal Society
Indian Civil Service (British India) officers